Tyrone Crews was a linebacker in the Canadian Football League playing 7 seasons with the BC Lions.

A graduate of Kansas State University, Crews joined the Leos in 1981 and was part of their 1985 Grey Cup championship team. He was winner of the Tom Pate Memorial Award for community service. In 2010, he was elected into the BC Lions Wall of Fame.

In 1995, Crews became head coach of the Vancouver Trojans and coached them for six seasons, compiling a 14 win, 42 loss and 2 tie record. In 1997, he was named BCFC Coach of the Year and was winner of the Gord Currie CJFL Coach of the Year Award.

References

1956 births
Living people
Players of Canadian football from New York (state)
Canadian football linebackers
BC Lions players
Kansas State University alumni
Kansas State Wildcats football players
Players of American football from New York City